Wheelbase was a BBC television series about cars, that was broadcast on BBC2 between 1964 and 1975.

Presenters
Amongst its presenters were Gordon Wilkins between 1964 and 1973 and Cliff Michelmore. The show was the predecessor of Top Gear.

History
Wheelbase was amongst the first programmes in the United Kingdom to be shown in colour during BBC2's "colour launching period".

Wheelbase's coverage of Formula One motor racing in the late 1960s was repeated during 2007 on United Kingdom satellite channel ESPN Classic. The programmes were transmitted largely as originally broadcast, but with occasional captions to put period commentary into context.

References

External links

1964 British television series debuts
1975 British television series endings
1960s British television series
1970s British television series